Masters of the Sea may refer to:

 Masters of the Sea (film), a 1922 Austrian film directed by Alexander Korda
 Masters of the Sea (TV series), a 1994 Singapore television drama series